The 2020 MotoAmerica Superbike Championship season was the 44th season of the premier class of circuit-based motorcycle racing in the United States and the 6th since its renaming to MotoAmerica. Cameron Beaubier entered the season as the defending champion, after taking his fourth title in 2019.

Calendar and results

Teams and riders

Championship standings

Riders' championship

Scoring system
Points are awarded to the top fifteen finishers. A rider has to finish the race to earn points.

Superbike Cup

References

External links
 

MotoAmerica
MotoAmerica Superbike
MotoAmerica Superbike